Luis Carlos Cardoso da Silva (born 11 December 1984) is a Brazilian paracanoeist. He is a six-time world champion.

Career
Silva won his fifth world championship in 2017 in the men's VL1 event, surpassing Fernando Fernandes de Pádua for the most by a Brazilian.

Silva represented Brazil at the 2016 Summer Paralympics in the men's KL1 event and finished in fourth place with a time 51.631. He again represented Brazil at the 2020 Summer Paralympics in the men's KL1 event and finished with a time of 48.031 and won a silver medal.

References

1984 births
Living people
Brazilian male canoeists
Paralympic medalists in paracanoe
Paralympic silver medalists for Brazil
Paracanoeists at the 2020 Summer Paralympics
Medalists at the 2020 Summer Paralympics
ICF Canoe Sprint World Championships medalists in paracanoe
Sportspeople from Piauí
20th-century Brazilian people
21st-century Brazilian people